Tupungato is a department located in the province of Mendoza, Argentina.

Its name comes from the Tupungato volcano (at 6,570 metres, one of Argentina's highest peaks). The volcano's name is said to mean "star viewpoint" in the Huarpe language.

The department is approximately 1,200 metres above mean sea level, and comprises 2.485 km² (1.6% of the provincial total).

The region is mainly dependent on agricultural production, with vineyards being its most important produce, representing 30% of the planted lands. Other regional products are fruit (mainly peach) and garlic. The wine industry, however, is particularly relevant due to the constant investments and intensive labour occupation. Recent developments in the Argentine economy have further fuelled the Argentine wine industry, attracting foreign investors and tourists to the region.

Districts

Anchoris
Cordón del Plata
El Peral, Tupungato
El Zampal
El Zampalito
Gualtallary
La Arboleda
La Carrera, Tupungato
San José

See also
Mendoza wine

External links
Official site 

1858 establishments in Argentina
Departments of Mendoza Province
Wine regions of Argentina